This list of articles and sections of the Vermont Constitution enumerates the contents of the Constitution of Vermont, which is organized into two parts, one declaring the rights of inhabitants and the other defining the governing power. The rights of the inhabitants are in 21 articles, addressing among other things the prohibition of slavery, compensation for use of property, freedom of worship, "free and pure" elections, search and seizure, freedom of speech and press, trial by jury, the right to bear arms and the right to assemble. The governing powers are in 76 sections, addressing among other things the composition of the legislative, executive and judicial bodies and their powers, the conduct of elections, and general administrative powers of government.

Rights of inhabitants

Governing power

See also
Vermont
Government of Vermont
Politics of Vermont

References

External links 
 Full text of the Vermont Constitution
 Official Website of the State of Vermont

Constitution of Vermont, List of articles and sections
Constitution